Kilkenny City Association Football Club was an Irish football club. The club played in the First Division of the League of Ireland until 18 January 2008 when they announced that they resigned their position in the league citing "lack of finance, poor results and paltry attendances".

The club hails from Kilkenny and used Buckley Park as their home pitch. Buckley Park has hosted many International under age soccer games. Kilkenny City will be entering the under 20 division this season which run co-currently with the schoolboy season (August to May).

History
In 1966 a group of Leaving Certificate students made the most of having a free class at the local Christian Brothers school. They debated the pros and cons, devised a plan and, finally, resolved to start a football club. The club was originally known as EMFA, becoming Kilkenny City in 1989. Jim Rhatigan was appointed as the club's secretary a position he still holds and since then he has become closely associated with football in Kilkenny. EM stood for Emmett Street and FA for Fatima Place where Jim Rhatigan grew up.

Initially EMFA competed in the U18 Kilkenny and District Youth League under the management of Donie Butler. Donie Butler served as Commercial Manager of the FAI during the Jack Charlton years. The club was unable to afford a new set of jerseys and so agreed to play in an all white strip. The logic being that all the players had at least one white T-shirt or shirt they could wear. The club's colours changed to claret and blue before changing again to black and amber, coinciding with the renaming of the club.

EMFA graduated from junior football in 1971–72 season. Jim Rhatigan became their manager and the club remained in junior football until 1984. During this period the club purchased  of land from a local farmer by the name of Mick Murphy, owner of the adjacent Tennypark House, for £16,000 punts. They had previously played their home games at the Freshford Road grounds, St. James Park. The ground was originally called Tennypark and was later named Buckley Park in honour of Marty Buckley. A bid of One million was made for the club's grounds in the late eighties but was rejected in the favour of football.

In 1984 the club won the Junior league and cup remaining undefeated throughout the entire season. It was decided that he club should apply for admission to the then League of Ireland (now the Airtricity League). In their maiden season Kilkenny City then known as EMFA, (from 1985 to 1989) finished tenth in the First Division. Their first League of Ireland game was played on 8 October 1985 at home to Derry City and ended in a 1–1 draw.

EMFA won their first honour in 1987, winning the League of Ireland First Division Shield defeating Finn Harps 4–2 in Oriel Park. The club changed its name to Kilkenny City in 1989. In 1991 under Joe McGrath (footballer) they reached the FAI Cup semi-final before suffering defeat to Shamrock Rovers.

In the 1996–97 season Kilkenny City won the First Division title with 11 points to spare over their nearest rivals Drogheda United thus gaining promotion to the Premier Division. Their stay in the premier was short however as they finished in eleventh the following season and were relegated back to the First Division.

In the 1999–00 season Kilkenny city finished third and beat Waterford United in a promotion-relegation playoff returning to the Premier. However, Kilkenny city were unable to extend their stay in the top flight beyond a single season managing only a single league victory throughout the whole season. General manager Jim Rhatigan wrote "Mud, Sweat and Jeers" a semi autobiographical account of the founding of the club.

The club celebrated its 40th anniversary in 2006. The anniversary was celebrated with a memorial mass at Father Fiachra's Church presided over by Father Willie Purcell and complete with a gospel choir. Dave Bassett, former Wimbledon manager was guest of honour with former Northern Ireland international, Gerry Taggart also attending the club's anniversary banquet at the Lyrath Estate Hotel.

2005 was notable for Kilkenny City by the arrival of Pat Scully. It was a season of two halves for the Black Cats.  Their record before June read – played 15, won 1, drew 4 and lost 10.  They sat on the bottom of the table with just 7 points out of a possible 45.  The squad was bolstered in key areas with a handful of summer transfers including David Cassidy from Derby County.  The new signings turned things around and immediately went on a run of six victories in a row culminating with the 5–0 destruction of Dundalk at Dundalk's home patch. Their record post-June finally read – played 21, won 14, drew 4 and lost only 3. Scully and his signings had quite miraculous taken Kilkenny from bottom of the table about halfway through the season to fourth by the end of the season.

Scully's success attracted the attention of Shamrock Rovers.  The lure of the big club was too much to turn down and Kilkenny had lost their manager by the beginning of the next season. Scully took the cream of the talent with him including David Cassidy, Tadhg Purcell and Aidan Price to Rovers leaving Kilkenny's squad looking very bare.

Scully's successor Adrian Fitzpatrick was sacked in October 2006. Gary Coad took over as caretaker manager until the end of the 2006 season.

The club appointed Brendan Rea as their new manager in preparation for the 2007 season until July when he resigned. Tommy Gaynor then took over as manager. Subsequently, Tommy Gaynor parted company with the club leaving Under 21 Manager Noel Byrne as the last ever caretaker/ manager. On 10 November 2007 Kilkenny City played their last League of Ireland game losing 3–1 at home to Finn Harps.

In January 2008 Kilkenny City resigned from the League of Ireland .

In 2011 the "Bring Back Kilkenny City AFC Foundation" was formed. Launched by a group of die hard Kilkenny City fans, they faced immediate competition from Carlow's proposed move to Buckley Park for the 2012 season. There is also a campaign to save Buckley Park as a sporting venue

Notable former players
 Synan Braddish
 James Scott
 Tommy Gaynor
 John Coleman
 Michael Reddy
 Tadhg Purcell
 Michael Walsh
 Paul McAreavey
 Colin Falvey
 Tony Hall

Notable former managers
 Jim Rhatigan: 1985–1989
 Eamonn Gregg: 1989–1990
 Joe McGrath : 1990–1991, 2000–2001
 Noel Synnott: 1991–1992
 Kieron Maher : (Caretaker)
 John Cleary: 1992–1994
 Paddy Gallacher: 1994–1995
 Jimmy Donnelly : (Caretaker)
 Alfie Hale: 1995–1999
 Pat Byrne: 1999–2000
 Paul Power : (Caretaker)
 Billy Walsh: 2001–2003
 Tommy Lynch: 2003
 Ger Bickerstaffe: 2004
 Pat Scully: 2005
 Adrian Fitzpatrick: 2006
 Gary Coad (Caretaker)
 Brendan Rea: Jan–July 2007
 Tommy Gaynor: July–Sept 2007
 Noel Byrne: (Caretaker)

Honours
League of Ireland First Division: 1
1996–97
League of Ireland First Division Shield: 1
 1986–87

Competition history
League
 Played 603
 Won 146
 Draw 150
 Lost 281
 Goals For 636
 Goals Against 899
 Points 539

All final positions are in Division 1 unless otherwise stated.

 As EMFA (1985–1990)
 1985–86: 10th
 1986–87: 9th
 1987–88: 10th
 1988–89: 9th
 As Kilkenny City
 1989–90: 4th
 1990–91: 7th
 1991–92: 8th
 1992–93: 9th
 1993–94: 8th
 1994–95: 10th
 1995–96: 7th
 1996–97: 1st
 1997–98: 11th (Premier Div)
 1998–99: 5th
 1999–00: 3rd
 2000–01: 12th (Premier Div)
 2001–02: 5th
 2002–03: 12th
 2004: 10th
 2005: 4th
 2006: 10th
 2007: 10th
 FAI Cup
 1990–91: Semi Final (Lost to Shamrock Rovers 1–0,losing finalist that year).
 1996–97: Round 1 (Lost to Bohemians 1–2 in replay at Dalymount Park)
 1997–98: Round 1 (Lost to UCD 0–4)
 1998–99: Quarter Finals (Kilkenny City were forced to forfeit the replay to Finn Harps, the losing finalists that year, after drawing the first game 2–2 as they had only eleven fit players, that include's two goalkeepers)
 1999–00: Quarter Finals (Lost to Bray Wanderers 0–2)
 2000–01: Quarter Finals (Lost to Bohemian 2–7, winners that year)
 2001–02: Round 3 (Lost to Dundalk 2–3, the eventual winners)
 2002–03: Quarter Finals (Lost to Shamrock Rovers 0–1, the losing finalists that year)
 2003: Round 2 (Lost to Limerick 1–2)
 2004: Round 3 (Lost to Waterford United 2–7, the losing finalists that year)
 2005: Round 2 (Lost to Finn Harps 0–1)
 2006: Round 2 (Lost to UCD 0–2)
 2007: Round 3 {Lost to Cork City 5–1, the eventual winners}

Attendances
 2004: Average: 200 Highest: 400
 2005: Average: 185 Highest: 400
 2006: Average: 118 Highest: 278 (v Dundalk)
Record Attendance: 6,500 (FAI Cup Semi-final v Shamrock Rovers 28 April 1991)

References

 
Association football clubs established in 1966
Association football clubs disestablished in 2008
Association football clubs in County Kilkenny
Defunct League of Ireland clubs
Former League of Ireland First Division clubs
1966 establishments in Ireland
2008 disestablishments in Ireland